Alexander Borisovich Stefanovich (13 December 1944 – 13 July 2021) was a Russian film director, producer, and screenwriter. Cavalier of Order of Friendship.

Biography
Was born in Leningrad on December 13, 1944. He graduated from the directing department of VGIK (workshop of Lev Kuleshov)  in 1969. He died from COVID-19 complications on 13 July 2021, at the age of 76.

Filmography
Residence (1972)
Dear Boy (1974)
Foam (1979)
Dusha (1981)
Start All Over Again (1985)
Bard's (1988)
Autumn Blues  (2001)
Time of Cruel (2004)
 The Notre Dame de Paris Mosque (2011)
Courage (2014)

References

External links

Soviet film directors
Russian film directors
1944 births
2021 deaths
Russian documentary filmmakers
Soviet male writers
Soviet screenwriters
20th-century Russian screenwriters
Male screenwriters
Soviet dramatists and playwrights
Russian dramatists and playwrights
Russian music video directors
Gerasimov Institute of Cinematography alumni
20th-century Russian male writers
Mass media people from Moscow
Deaths from the COVID-19 pandemic in Russia